Latveria is a fictional country appearing in American comic books published by Marvel Comics. It is depicted within the storylines of Marvel's comic titles as a small, isolated European country ruled by the fictional Supreme Lord Doctor Doom, supposedly located in the Banat region. It is surrounded by the Carpathian Mountains, and also borders fictional Symkaria (home of Silver Sable) to the south. Its capital is Doomstadt.

Publication history
Latveria first appeared in Fantastic Four Annual #2, published in 1964. Victor Von Doom is the ruler of Latveria. Though he has been dethroned a number of times, Victor has invariably managed to return to the throne of his country within a matter of months.

Victor also has a council who obey him entirely. In Fantastic Four #536 in 2006, he killed his own Prime Minister for claiming control of Latveria in his absence and threatened to kill two other ministers if they failed to find the landing spot of Thor's hammer.

Doctor Doom's style of rule can best be described as an absolute monarchy, as it was revealed that there is no legislature, and one minister boasted "Doctor Doom decides everything. His slightest whim is Latverian law!" It is shown Doom has devices throughout the Kingdom to watch his people and even has hidden weapons to prevent them leaving without his consent. In one story he is able to activate a force field around Latveria which prevents anybody leaving, though apparently it can be a defense against nuclear attack.

History
Located in southeast Europe, Latveria was formed out of land annexed from southern Hungary centuries before, and possibly land from Serbia as well as Romania.

At some point, Doctor Doom had his army of Servo Guards invade Rotruvia where he was successful in its annexation.

Latveria under the Fantastic Four
Due to Doom's undertakings that drive him away from Latveria, the monarch is often absent. After Doom's descent into Hell, the nation became a target for conquest by the neighboring countries. This forces Reed Richards to seize control of the country, attempting to pry the populace out from under the thumb of Doom, while at the same time disarming all of Doom's weaponry and technology, so if he ever returned, he would come back to absolutely nothing. In the process, Richards relocated Doom from Hell into a pocket dimension of his own design, and although Doom used his consciousness-switching abilities to escape, the death of his host body seemingly caused him to die as well, and the Fantastic Four pulled out of the country.

Doom survives this and rules Latveria for a time with a 'puppet' Prime Minister and robotic enforcers.

Series of takeovers
After the Fantastic Four left, the United States attempted to fill the void left by Doom by establishing a democracy for the nation. The Countess Lucia von Bardas was elected as Prime Minister. However, when it was revealed that von Bardas was employing the Tinkerer to use Doom's technology to arm various tech-based villains in the United States, S.H.I.E.L.D. Commander Nick Fury took action.

During Secret War, Fury and a number of superheroes invaded Latveria without permission of the US Government and attempted to assassinate von Bardas. While von Bardas survived, she was horribly disfigured and sought to destroy Fury and the heroes responsible. She was killed by S.H.I.E.L.D. Agent Daisy Johnson while trying to blow up New York with the armor of the various villains she employed.

Country-wide disasters
Much of Latveria was destroyed and the population severely reduced by an attack executed by the Marquis of Death (a.k.a. "Dooms Master").

S.H.I.E.L.D., under the leadership of Iron Man and his team of U.S. sanctioned Avengers invaded Latveria after discovering Doom's (unintentional) involvement in the release of a symbiote virus on New York. The country was yet again devastated and Doom was taken into custody for crimes against humanity.

Doom is released from prison due to the influence of H.A.M.M.E.R director Norman Osborn. He restores his nation with the use of his time travel technology.

Avengers Vs. X-Men
During the Avengers vs. X-Men storyline, Spider-Man fights against a Juggernaut-empowered Colossus here.

Statistics
The common geographic description of Latveria places it as a small nation, around the area where Hungary, Romania and Serbia (Vojvodina) meet in real life. To its south in the Marvel universe is the nation of Symkaria, which is depicted as a benevolent constitutional monarchy in contrast to the dictatorship to its north. The capital city of Latveria is Doomstadt, formerly Hassenstadt, renamed when Doom seized power, located just north of the Kline River. The administrative center is Castle Doom.

 Population: 500,000 (This is an approximation since the government of Latveria has been fiercely secretive of its census activity)
 Type of Government: Dictatorship (Victor Von Doom prefers to call this an "enforced monarchy")
 Languages: German, Hungarian, English, Latverian (local dialect, derivative of Hungarian), Romanian.
 Ethnic Groups: Mixed European stock, Slavs, Roma, Greek, possibly Bulgarians who migrated in Banat during the Ottoman rule in Bulgaria
 Major Business Centers: None
 Currency: Latverian Franc
 Public Holidays: Doom's Day, Christmas, New Year (Note: Doom's Day is an eclectic holiday, celebrated whenever Doom declares it. It is different from Doomsday and independent of Doomsday)
 Airports: The only airport for the country, Doomsport, lies on the southern outskirts of Doomstadt. It maintains two runways and a modern terminal, but flights into and out of Doomsport are quite limited. There have been no scheduled flights from Latveria to western European nations or the United States, due to a combination of Latveria's poor economy, international embargoes, and that no major airline has seen profit in establishing a route to Latveria.

Cities and towns
 Doomsburg -
 Doomsdale -
 Doomstadt - The capital of Latveria, replacing on the map the real-life Romanian city of Timișoara. The "City of Doom" (The suffix "-stadt" is German for "city")
 Doomsvale -
 Doomton -
 Doomwood -
Doomcity -

Points of interest
 Boar's Vale -
 Castle Doom - An ancient castle with modern-day technology, home to Victor Von Doom.
 Citadel of Doom -
 Cynthia Von Doom Memorial Park -
 Doom Falls -
 Doom Island - While not part of Latveria, Doom Island is a private island, located somewhere near the coast of Japan and cloaked from the world by an invisible shield. This island is where Doom keeps hidden the mutant citizens of Latveria and a legion of Doombot/Sentinel hybrids.
 Doomsport Airport - The only airport in Latveria, which is located south of Doomstadt.
 Doomstadt Rail Station -
 Doomstadt Rathauz -
 Doomwood Forest -
 Folding City -
 Lanzarini Temple -
 Heroic Andrew Boulevard -
 Kron Victory Swad -
 Latverian Academy of the Science -
 Latverian Southern Border -
 Monument Park -
 Mount Sorcista - A demon sorceress named Pandemonia lives here.
 Mount Victorum -
 Old Town of Doomstadt - It is located in Doomstadt and overlooked by Castle Doom.
 St. Blaise Church -
 St. Peter Church -
 Werner Academy -

Demographics
The population consists of mixed European stock and Romani people, in whose welfare Von Doom takes a particular interest. Victor Von Doom, being Roma, has declared the Romani a protected class and attempts to shower them with benefits, however due to Latveria's poor economy and oppressive rule their lifestyles hardly outshine other ethnicities, and the Romani by and large live in the same fear of their own government as do fellow Latverians.

Law enforcement
Because it lacks a native superhero populace, Latveria relies largely on Dooms' robot sentinels called Doombots to keep law and order. One of the few known Latverian superhumans is Dreadknight, whom Doom himself created by punishing Dreadknight's alter ego for hoarding ideas from him. Dreadknight has since tried to get revenge on Doctor Doom, only to be thwarted by various superheroes. 
Aside from superhuman activity, the Latverian military appears to function in multiple capacity; in addition to being responsible for defense of Latveria (or more accurately, keeping Victor Von Doom on the throne), they have been commissioned to make arrests and function as Latveria's secret police.

Economy

Much of Latveria's economy depends on Doctor Doom's high-tech inventions. The country's official currency is the "Latverian Franc" - because Doctor Doom refuses to join the European Union or adopt the Euro. The Latverian Franc is still considered to be reasonably strong against the United States Dollar.

State
Latveria is generally depicted as a rural nation with a primitive economy and a population living an almost medieval lifestyle, likely enforced by Doom. Nonetheless, the state itself is consistently depicted as a global superpower on-par with or even surpassing any nation on Earth, including the United States, and rivalled only by the likes of Wakanda. This is largely due to Doom himself being a scientific genius of the highest order, not only possessing but actually inventing numerous technological wonders, including time and interdimensional travel, personally creating a highly sophisticated robot army of myriad designs and capabilities, and frequently coming into possession of—or outright creating—various devices that could be classified as Weapons of Mass Destruction. Thus, despite the country being both extremely small and economically backward, it is a powerhouse in military and technological terms and therefore has a vastly disproportionate influence on global affairs relative to its size and GDP. Doom also proudly claims that the country is free of poverty, disease, famine and crime and while citizens of the nation are commonly shown to be oppressed and to live in fear of their monarch, they are also shown to be relatively well cared for, so long as they do not cross Doom. Other occasions suggest that Doom is at the centre of a self-propagated personality cult and is admired and worshipped by other segments of the populace in spite of his mistreatments and he is often demonstrated to be at least a more stable and less corrupt ruler than any other Latverian leader who has replaced him.

Known inhabitants
 Doctor Doom - The current ruler of Latveria.
 Alexander Flynn - The alleged mutant son of Doctor Doom and an unidentified Romani woman.
 Arturo Frazen - He was installed as Latveria's ambassador during the temporary reign of Prince Zorba Fortunov.
 Baron Karl Hassen - He was the ruler of Latveria during the 14th Century.
 Baron Karl Hassen III - He was part of Latveria's royalty sometime before Doctor Doom became Latveria's ruler.
 Boris - Doctor Doom's Zefiro guardian since childhood and closest confidant.
 Count Sabbat - He was part of Latveria's royalty during the 15th Century.
 Cristos Malachi - A one-time member of Doctor Doom's Zefiro Gypsy Clan. He served as the Zefiro Gypsy Clan's fortune-teller.
 Cynthia Von Doom - The mother of Doctor Doom.
 Daniel Kurtz - A one-time classmate of Doctor Doom. He lost an eye during Victor's experiment which involved contacting his mother.
 Djordji Zindelo Hungaro - The Zefiro mystic who trained Cynthia Von Doom in the mystic arts.
 Dreadknight - A Latverian scientist who had a skull-shaped cybernetic helmet bio-fused to his head by Doctor Doom and developed a vendetta against him.
 Editor - He was tasked with rewriting Latverian history to conform with Doctor Doom's world view.
 Fydor Gittrlsohn - One of Doctor Doom's chief scientists.
 Gert Hauptmann - One of Doctor Doom's chief scientists and the brother of Gustav Hauptmann. His attempt at betrayal led to his death at the hands of Doctor Doom.
 Gustav Hauptmann - One of Doctor Doom's chief scientists. He was a former Nazi that worked for Adolf Hitler and Red Skull. When the flamethrower that Gustav was using to attack Mister Fantastic with endangered his art collection, Doctor Doom reversed the sonic weapon he planned to use on the Fantastic Four and killed Gustav Hauptmann instead.
 Gustav von Kampen - A one-time member of Doctor Doom's Zefiro Gypsy Clan.
 Gustav van Erven - A Latverian refugee living on Brazil on Doctor Doom 2099 timeline.
 Hans Stutgart - A Latverian agent who is living in the United States.
 Jakob Gorzenk - He serves as the chief ambassador to the United States.
 King Rudolfo I - He ruled Latveria sometime before Doctor Doom became Latveria's ruler.
 King Stefan - He ruled Latveria sometime before Doctor Doom became Latveria's ruler.
 King Vladimir Vassily Gonereo Tristian Mangegi Fortunov - The tyrannical ruler of Latveria who was extremely harsh to the gypsies that lived on the borders. He was killed by Doctor Doom.
 Kristoff Vernard - The adopted son of Doctor Doom. His mother was killed by a robot that was used by Prince Zorba Fortunov.
 Kroft Family - A family of vampire hunters that existed from the 16th Century to the 19th Century.
 Kurt Kroft - 
 Leo Kroft -
 Oscar Kroft -
 Pietro Kroft -
 Stefan Kroft -
 Wilhelm Kroft -
 Larin - A Tibetan Monk who helped to construct Doctor Doom's first armor.
 Lucia von Bardas - The Prime Minister of Latveria.
 Mengo Brothers - A pair of international mercenaries.
 Grigori Mengochuzcraus -
 Stanislaus Mengochuzcraus -
 Otto Kronsteig - One of Doctor Doom's chief scientists.
 Prince Rudolfo Fortunov - The former crown prince of Latveria before his family was ousted by Doctor Doom.
 Prince Zorba Fortunov - The former prince of Latveria and brother of Rudolfo. He once reclaimed the throne to Latveria when the Fantastic Four had defeated Doctor Doom. With the help of the Fantastic Four, Doctor Doom was able to reclaim his throne.
 Robert Doom - The distant cousin of Doctor Doom.
 Torvalt - A one-time member of Doctor Doom's Zefiro Gypsy Clan.
 Tristian de Sabbat - A member of Doctor Doom's inner circle responsible for holy propaganda.
 Valeria - The teenage love of Doctor Doom's life who is the granddaughter of Boris. Her life was sacrificed to the Haazareth Three (a group of demons) by Doctor Doom.
 Vlad Draasen - He was a member of Latveria's royalty during the 15th Century.
 Werner Von Doom - A talented doctor of the Zefiro Gypsy Tribe and father of Doctor Doom.

Other versions

King Loki
In the future depicted in Loki: Agent of Asgard, Doctor Doom discovers Latveria completely destroyed after King Loki destroyed the Earth. Doom attempts to prevent this future by imprisoning the Loki of the present.

Marvel 1602
In the Marvel 1602 storyline, Latveria is ruled by Count Otto von Doom, also known as Otto the Handsome. It is inhabited by mythical beings, and Latveria experiments on intricate clockwork devices, one of which was used to kill Queen Elizabeth I of England. The native language appears to bear a close resemblance to modern German.

Marvel 2099
In the alternate future called "Marvel 2099", various power struggles over the fate of Latveria end with most of the country's population destroyed by chemical weapons known as "necrotoxins".

Marvel Zombies
In the Marvel Zombies storyline, Latveria is one of the last few outposts of humanity, as Doctor Doom gathers up the fittest and most fertile of the Latverian survivors in order to send them off to other dimensions. An army of super-zombies lay siege to Doom's castle and eventually break inside. Despite this and Doom himself being bitten, all the Latverian citizens successfully escape.

Ultimate Marvel
In Ultimate Marvel, Latveria was introduced as a bankrupt peasant nation, but thanks to Doctor Doom it was made the ninth richest country on Earth. The townsfolk wear Doom's dragon tattoos, which incorporate microfibers that interfaced with the brain, acting as mind control devices. Where this Latveria lies is unclear but there are Belgian Flags on display in the background in the one picture displayed of Latveria.

In Ultimate Marvel Team-Up, Latveria was presented as an impoverished dictatorial theocracy, under "his holiness" President Victor Von Doom (wearing his traditional Marvel armor and cloak). They attempted, in collusion with the United States via Nick Fury, to steal the Iron Man technology from Tony Stark; this fails, partly due to the intervention of Spider-Man. At some point, however, Doom declared a holy war on the United States, creating tensions between two countries.  Like most in this comic, this would be ignored and retconned away in later Ultimate Marvel titles.

In other media

Television
 Latveria appears in the 1994 Fantastic Four TV series.
 Latveria appears in The Super Hero Squad Show episode "Pedicure of Doom." Doctor Doom, MODOK, and Abomination fall back to Castle Doom only to find that Doctor Doom's mother Cynthia "Coco" Von Doom had converted it into a spa with Chthon's help.
 Latveria is mentioned in the Iron Man: Armored Adventures episode "The Might of Doom."
 Latveria appears in The Avengers: Earth's Mightiest Heroes episode "The Private War of Doctor Doom."
 Latveria appears in the Ultimate Spider-Man episode "Doomed." Spider-Man, Power Man, Iron Fist, Nova, and White Tiger head to Latveria in order to capture Doctor Doom as part of their plan to impress Nick Fury. The Latverian Embassy appears in the episode "Not a Toy" when Captain America's shield ends up in the Latverian Embassy and that Spider-Man must work with Captain America to get it back before Doctor Doom can experiment with it.
 Latveria appears in Avengers Assemble episode "The Doomstroyer". The Avengers head there where Doctor Doom has taken the Asgardian armor, Destroyer.
 Latveria appears in the Hulk and the Agents of S.M.A.S.H. episode "Red Rover." Red Hulk unknowingly drops off Devil Dinosaur in Latveria when he mistook it for Transia. In the "Days of Future Smash" episodes, the Latverian embassy is featured, where the Leader breaks in to steal one of the time belts to go back in time.

Film
 In the Fantastic Four film, Latveria is mentioned initially in reference to Victor Von Doom's past and is described as "the old country", possibly indicating his birth there. After "The End" has appeared, Von Doom's incarcerated body is shown on board a ship bound for Latveria. Also during the scene where he first dons his trademark metal mask, a plaque can be seen declaring it as a gift to Doom from the people of Latveria.
 In the sequel Fantastic Four: Rise of the Silver Surfer, Doom is reawakened in his castle by the Silver Surfer's passage through Latveria. The capital's name has been changed from "Doomstadt" to "Hassenstadt", likely because Doom is merely a native of the country in this continuity, rather than its leader, as the previous movie established him as merely a wealthy businessman.
In the trailer for the 2015 reboot of Fantastic Four, about 45 seconds into the trailer an IP address was shown on the bottom left hand corner of the screen. That IP address leads to this article. In the movie itself, Latveria is shown to be Doom's home country on a government report on him.
Marvel Cinematic Universe writer Eric Pearson stated in an interview with IGN that he included an ultimately deleted reference to Latveria in Black Widow, admitting that he always tries to include references to Latveria in the MCU when possible.

Video games
 In the 1980s computer game Accolade's Comics the protagonist Steve Keene is offered tickets to the Latverian Ballet.
 In Spider-Man: The Game, a billboard can be seen in the first level advertising tourism in Latvania, a misspelling of Latveria.
 Latveria is referred to in the Spider-Man 2 video game when J. Jonah Jameson says that a Latverian diplomat is landing at the United Nations building by helicopter, although circumstances force the player to miss sighting any such diplomat.
 In the Ultimate Spider-Man video game, the Beetle was reported to have ducked into the Latverian Embassy after evading Spider-Man. In the special edition of the game, the player can look at concept art that shows what happens to Beetle after his confrontation with Spider-Man. He flies into the embassy and walks up to a throne, kneels down, and presents the Sandman vial to Doctor Doom in some plot to develop super-soldiers for Latveria. Later on in the game, the Green Goblin is seen escaping from the Latverian Embassy.
 In Marvel: Ultimate Alliance, Castle Doom in Latveria is a level. If the player asks about Latveria to Vision, he mentions that there is barely any crime there since Doctor Doom's robots are always patrolling the country.
 The Latverian Embassy is featured in The Incredible Hulk video game.
 Latveria is featured in Marvel: Ultimate Alliance 2. The first part of the game is based on the Secret War storyline. Nick Fury leads the heroes to Latveria to deal with Lucia von Bardas after the President does not want to take action against her illegal activities.
 The Latverian Embassy is featured in Marvel: Avengers Alliance.
 Latveria appears in Lego Marvel Super Heroes. The level "Doctor in the House" takes place in Castle Doom.
 In Marvel Heroes, The player explores the city of Doomstadt and also manages to explore Castle Doom leading up to a final confrontation in Doom's throne room.

Newspapers 
In a 1992, month-long edition of the Spider-Man serial strip by Stan Lee, Latveria and Dr. Doom are featured prominently. The story begins with J.J Jameson's assistant Robbie suggesting that Latveria is up to something, marked by Latveria's prolonged absence from United Nations meetings. The strip is then interspersed with Doctor Doom's iron rule over Latverians and Peter and Mary Jane Parker posing as tourists entering Latveria (to provide cover for Peter Parker's attempt to find out what Dr. Doom is plotting). Doom's withdrawal is soon revealed a launching a satellite that will fire lasers on oil wells anywhere on Earth, effectively holding the world responsive to Doom's demands. Doom opens fire on one small oil field as an example of his power projection. The satellite also creates a force field that protects it and Latveria from the forthcoming missile counterattacks. President Bush, as well as other First World leaders, ignore all of Doom's demands, causing an enraged Doom to order the satellite to open fire on "a dozen oil fields, at once!", which ultimately proves his undoing as that requires a time window to charge such a large amount. Spider-Man takes advantage of this to overload the satellite, thus nullifying Doom's threats. In a subplot, Dr. Doom's autocratic manner is also shown when he sees a captured Peter and Mary Jane. The despot announces his plans to become a prominent world leader, but should not do it as a single man, saying that in his capacity as a leader he has the power to annul Peter Parker's marriage and make Mary Jane his queen consort, a different take from the Fantastic Four storylines which usually show Doom trying to force Susan Richards to be on his arm.

Reception
Bustle published a humorous article about how to convince people that Latveria is a real place, saying "Latveria doesn't sound made up [...] in this case, Latveria is very much fake — which doesn't mean you can't still have fun convincing people it's real, though."

Screen Rant writes that ever since 1962's The Fantastic Four #5, "the tiny country of Latveria has long been a thorn in the side of Marvel's heroes", noting that it was long established as a Southeastern European country, and as of 2020 firmly located in the Banat region, so that "This fixed location for Latveria grounds the nation more fully in readers' understanding of the real world, suggesting realistic political tensions and even geographical factors which can play into future stories."

Mark Hibbett of Central Saint Martins notes that Latveria in 1964 was described as a small East European country "nestling in the heart of the Bavarian alps", and he explains that "Right from the start Latveria is presented as a very strange place, like a fairy tale village transplanted into the real world, with Jack Kirby's illustrations showing an almost medieval world of peasant cottages and  gypsy caravans."

Further reading
War, Politics and Superheroes: Ethics and Propaganda in Comics and Film by Marc DiPaolo, McFarland (2014)
Caped Crusaders 101: Composition Through Comic Books by Jeffrey Kahan and Stanley Stewart, McFarland (2006)
"Latveria's Place in Marvel Geopolitics" by Josh Weiss, Marvel.com (April 1, 2019)
The Hidden Europe: What Eastern Europeans Can Teach Us by Francis Tapon (2012)

References

External links

 Latveria at Marvel.com
 Latveria at Marvel Wiki
 Article on History of Latveria

Doctor Doom
Fantastic Four
Fictional European countries
Latverians
Marvel Comics countries
Marvel Comics locations
Fictional elements introduced in 1964